Castelvittorio (locally ) is a comune (municipality) in the Province of Imperia in the Italian region Liguria, located about  southwest of Genoa and about  west of Imperia.

Castelvittorio borders the following municipalities: Apricale, Bajardo, Isolabona, Molini di Triora, Pigna and Triora.

The parish church of St. Stephen houses 16th or 17th century bas-relief, a Crucifixion of Jesus by Marcello Venusti (late 16th century) and a crucifix by Anton Maria Maragliano.

References

Cities and towns in Liguria